George Daly is a music executive, songwriter, musician, video and music producer, award-winning film director and inventor. In his role as a  music Industry  A&R (Artists & Repertoire) executive he has worked with artists and groups such as Janis Joplin, The Cars, Tool (band), Huey Lewis, Carlos Santana, and others. Artists to whose efforts Daly has contributed have sold in excess of 300 million singles and albums in vinyl, tape, CD, and digital download format.

Moving from the Washington, D.C. area to San Francisco in the 1960s, Daly befriended Janis Joplin and was soon hired by Columbia Records as CBS Corporate San Francisco Head of A&R spanning the Clive Davis and Goddard Lieberson eras. Following that, Daly was named head of A&R at Elektra/Asylum Records, and later directly hired as Head of Artist & Repertoire by Ahmet Ertegun at Atlantic Records (WMG), where he worked under Doug Morris. He then worked with Zoo Entertainment (Bertelsmann Music Group) as both corporate Vice President and head of the Artists & Repertoire division. Daly is the recipient of multiple Gold Record and Platinum Record music recording certifications.

Daly discovered and contracted musical artists such as The Cars, signing the band to a long-term Elektra/Asylum recording contract on a paper napkin after a live performance at Harvard University. The band’s first album, The Cars, stayed on the charts for 139 weeks and sold over six million copies in the US. Daly also discovered and brought The Tubes, a surreal SF theatrical rock band, to A&M Records. Daly also signed Bill Manspeaker’s Green Jellÿ to BMG/Zoo. Green Jelly members Maynard James Keenan and Danny Carey then founded Tool, again on BMG/Zoo. Daly has also worked professionally as a songwriter/musician with many other prominent artists and musicians, such as Roy Buchanan, Nils Lofgren and Boz Scaggs. Daly co-wrote Boz Scaggs’ "Slow Dancer," which some consider to be the artist’s greatest musical achievement. Daly has also worked with Huey Lewis, Carlos Santana, and Alice Coltrane. Daly also worked with the family of Jimi Hendrix in producing The River of Color and Sound, an award-winning interactive multimedia biography of Carlos Santana.

Early life and education
Daly was born the second of six siblings at the United States Naval Hospital in Annapolis, Maryland to U.S. Navy Captain George William Daly, Sr., former Deputy Chief of Industrial Relations for the U.S. Navy, and Frances Helen Daly, who encouraged her son’s creativity. He showed an aptitude in his early years for science, technology, and music, writing his first song in 4th grade and crafting early electric guitars and sound amplifier circuits. In 8th grade, he invented a device he entered into a local science fair which used light waves to transmit sound across a large hall.

By his early teens he was playing guitar, electric bass and keyboards, and writing songs. He founded several bands, beginning with The Hangmen. The Hangmen are credited on record with the singles "What a Girl Can't Do", "Faces" and "Bad Goodbye," among others. The song "...Girl...", written and recorded by Tom Guernsey and Joe Tripplet, with its Everly Brothers' Wake up Little Susie guitar riff and Bob Berberich's drumming, plus the band's live performance, pushed the Hangmen past The Beatles to the number one position in the Washington, D.C. regional radio charts. Daly's original song "Faces" is noted in the 21st century as a prototypical punk rock anthem.

Music industry 

After joining Columbia Records, Daly’s first role was head of A&R for the San Francisco division. Clive Davis served as Daly’s mentor. At the time Columbia Records had just begun to enter the West Coast modern rock market, opening both a state-of-the art recording studio (CBS recording studio on Folsom St., San Francisco) and A&R offices at Fisherman's Wharf. Daly has also been a senior executive at Divisions of four major U.S. record labels (Columbia, Elektra/Asylum/Atlantic/BMG), and is currently the CEO of About Records, a label distributed by Universal Music Group/UMG/Fontana. As an A&R executive, Daly has worked with or discovered many of the ground-breaking music acts that eventually defined their genre, including Janis Joplin, Carlos Santana, The Cars, and Tool, among others. Throughout his career he has worked directly with prominent music industry leaders such as “industry legend” Clive Davis, Ahmet Ertegun ("one of the most significant figures in the modern recording industry."), and songwriter and serial music business CEO, Doug Morris.

Daly's tenure in the music businesses' modern high-sales era coincides with the rise of the modern "tonnage" popularity of recorded music and the transition to non-physical media and global streaming music.

Song writing and music performance 
Daly founded and performed in three historically noteworthy DC bands: The Hangmen, Dolphin, and Grin. The Hangmen’s performances instigated at least one 3000+ person fan riot in suburban Virginia, which was written up in Billboard magazine as one of the first of the '60's US "rock & roll riots'' before the Beatles’ dominance of the charts. Daly also founded the historically important DC folk-blues band, Dolphin (signed to Seymour Stein’s Sire Records/London Records) in 1967. The band included Daly, Bob Berberich, Paul Dowell, Nils Lofgren, and Roy Buchanan, whom Rolling Stone Magazine described as "one of the three greatest living guitarists." Daly then formed the trio Grin with fellow Hangmen alumni and drummer and friend Bob Berberich and Nils Lofgren. Daly came to California after a chance meeting in Washington, DC between Neil Young and Nils Lofgren. Young asked Lofgren to come and bring the band to stay at his home in California, bringing Daly west to Laurel Canyon in the Hollywood Hills.

Lofgren worked on several Neil Young albums and would go on to join Bruce Springsteen's E Street Band. The song Slow Dancer which Daly co-wrote with Boz Scaggs went multi-platinum, being recorded by Scaggs, Emmylou Harris and Rita Coolidge, among others. Daly's latest song co-writing has been with singer/songwriter Tim Hockenberry, who Howard Stern praised as his all-time favorite singer when the Hockenberry appeared on America’s Got Talent.

Technology and patents 
Daly holds six US patents for audio and musical devices and is inventor of various audio devices including the early electrical guitar processor, the “Moan Tone,” which was used by Nils Lofgren and others in live performance and recording and the “Master Mount” recording studio device, (later sold to Tandy Corp). Daly has consulted to the US Government's Comcast STC Satellite Television Corporation where he designed the PSR2000, the first prototype desktop consumer unit for digital music downloads, developed in conjunction with Hartford Gunn, the first president of PBS.

At the request of Keith Richards and Rob Fraboni, Daly, starting at the 63,000 seat Oakland Coliseum went on the road and recorded The Rolling Stones during their US Bridges To Babylon tour using his experimental Aura-Live recording technology.

Film, video, television, digital multimedia, streaming music and productions 
As head of the A&R divisions at the three largest American Record labels, Daly has overseen hundreds of artists, including their signings and album productions. These include multi-platinum artists such as Janis Joplin, the Cars, Carlos Santana, Tool, Boz Scaggs, and Green Jellÿ. Daly has also recorded The Rolling Stones on tour, as well as recording Huey Lewis (in Clover, Summers Here/Pyramid Records); Gene Clark; Marc V (Too True/Elektra Records); Family Brown (Imaginary World/United Artists Records); Grammy-nominated composer Michael Hoppé (Simple Pleasures/Seventh Wave); Pamela Polland (Pamela Polland/Columbia Records); Boulder (Boulder, Elektra Records); Alejandro Escovedo in the early punk/new wave band The Nuns, with Jennifer Miro; Blue Train (Blue Train, All I Want Is You/BMG) which gave Bertelsmann/BMG/Zoo its first pop Top 40 US Hit; Laura Allan, the singer often cited as the important inspiration to Joni Mitchell in her Blue and post Blue vocal style; Booker T. (Bittersweet/Epic Records); Skinny Songs for Heidi Roizen; Tim Hockenberry, (Back In Your Arms/About Records/Universal Music Group); Larkin Gayle (Two Hands/About Records/Universal Music Group); Jon Collins, (Jon Collins/Coliseum/About Records); and the "sui generis" YASSOU.

Daly wrote and produced the first digitally recorded (SoundStream system) live music video and TV series, StudioLive, which was short-listed in the Emmy's technical category. StudioLive starred Freddie Hubbard, with music composed and conducted by Allyn Ferguson. Daly also wrote, produced and served as an Executive Producer of the multimedia life story of Carlos Santana, The River of Color and Sound, for Polygram Multimedia. Daly and Colin Farish created the pilot television show Sanctuary of Sound, with Daly on-screen and in discussion with such music business notables as Narada Michael Walden and Ben Fong-Torres.

Daly co-directed, and co-wrote Gary Yost’s multiple award-winning documentary about the restoration of Marin County's Mount Tamalpais: The Invisible Peak (narrated by Peter Coyote). Daly also produced all the music and sound design in the film, which includes compositions by Grammy nominated Michael Hoppé and multi-Emmy award-winning composer Ron Alan Cohen.

Daly has also served as a consultant to the Smithsonian Institution’s National Museum of American History, where he produced the major DC exhibit in which the original Star Spangled Banner anthem was performed with period-accurate instruments. Daly recorded and produced a unique Smithsonian exhibit of Francis Scott Key's original song using a modern studio orchestra playing the original instruments from the mid-19th century. Daly acquired the rare instruments with the help of  Dr. Arthur Mollela, then Chairman of the museum’s department of the History of Science and Technology at the Smithsonian Institution.

At his Advisor Intel consultancy (founded 2018), George Daly and William Daly identified and coordinated the acquisition for ACX Music/UFC of 45 million streaming music licenses as well as the design of the UFC's Ultimate Sound streaming music service, one of the first corporate (the UFC) branded streaming music services.

Teen Hoot 
To give back to youth in music, Daly co-founded the Teen Hoot with Nashville producer/songwriter David Malloy. The Teen Hoot, using live and streamed music performances with a growing, large online community propelled by video, YouTube, Instagram, Facebook and Twitter (where the Hoot has trended Twitter top three in the world), encourages young singers and songwriters to learn their craft. Hoot's one voting event garnered over 1,300,000 votes from online fans.

Lifetime music business governance and affiliations 
Daly is a founding Board of Governors member and co-founder of the San Francisco chapter of NARAS, as well as a lifetime member of NARAS (the Grammy Organization) as a Los Angeles member. Daly is also a lifetime member of Mensa and holds an FCC Amateur Extra-Class radio license.

References 

Record producers from California
Living people
Businesspeople from Washington, D.C.
Businesspeople from San Francisco
Mensans
Year of birth missing (living people)